Sokolovsky (masculine), Sokolovskaya (feminine), or Sokolovskoye (neuter) is the name of several rural localities in Russia:
Sokolovsky, Bryansk Oblast, a settlement in Litizhsky Selsoviet of Komarichsky District of Bryansk Oblast
Sokolovsky, Kostroma Oblast, a settlement in Zeblyakovskoye Settlement of Sharyinsky District of Kostroma Oblast
Sokolovsky, Sverdlovsk Oblast, a settlement in Irbitsky District of Sverdlovsk Oblast
Sokolovsky, Tula Oblast, a khutor in Shakhtersky Rural Okrug of Bogoroditsky District of Tula Oblast
Sokolovsky, Volgograd Oblast, a khutor in Sokolovsky Selsoviet of Nekhayevsky District of Volgograd Oblast
Sokolovsky, Bobrovsky District, Voronezh Oblast, a khutor in Nikolskoye Rural Settlement of Bobrovsky District of Voronezh Oblast
Sokolovsky, Novokhopyorsky District, Voronezh Oblast, a settlement in Kolenovskoye Rural Settlement of Novokhopyorsky District of Voronezh Oblast
Sokolovskoye, Republic of Bashkortostan, a village in Ilyino-Polyansky Selsoviet of Blagoveshchensky District of the Republic of Bashkortostan
Sokolovskoye, Chelyabinsk Oblast, a selo in Sokolovsky Selsoviet of Uysky District of Chelyabinsk Oblast
Sokolovskoye, Kostroma Oblast, a village under the administrative jurisdiction of  Ponazyrevo Urban Settlement (urban-type settlement), Ponazyrevsky District, Kostroma Oblast
Sokolovskoye, Krasnodar Krai, a selo in Sokolovsky Rural Okrug of Gulkevichsky District of Krasnodar Krai
Sokolovskoye, Orenburg Oblast, a selo in Srednekargalsky Selsoviet of Sakmarsky District of Orenburg Oblast
Sokolovskaya (rural locality), a village in Razinsky Selsoviet of Kharovsky District of Vologda Oblast